The Carrollton–Prestonville Bridge is a continuous truss bridge that carries U.S. Route 42 and Kentucky Route 36 across the Kentucky River between Carrollton and Prestonville, Kentucky. It carries approximately 9,640 cars a day as of 2009. The bridge is located just south of the confluence of the Ohio and Kentucky rivers. The original bridge was toll bridge that opened in 1900. In 1952, it was replaced by a new bridge just a few feet downstream. The piers and eastern approach of the original bridge remain.

See also
 
 
 

Road bridges in Kentucky
Buildings and structures in Carroll County, Kentucky
U.S. Route 42
Bridges of the United States Numbered Highway System
Former toll bridges in Kentucky
Bridges over the Kentucky River
Transportation in Carroll County, Kentucky
Carrollton, Kentucky